Nirmal Lorick (born 10 September 1965) is a Trinidad and Tobago boxer. He competed in the men's featherweight event at the 1984 Summer Olympics.

References

1965 births
Living people
Trinidad and Tobago male boxers
Olympic boxers of Trinidad and Tobago
Boxers at the 1984 Summer Olympics
Place of birth missing (living people)
Featherweight boxers